The third season of the animated television series Teen Titans, based on the DC comics series of the same time by Bob Haney and Bruno Premiani, originally aired on Cartoon Network in the United States. Developed by Glen Murakami, Sam Register, and television writer David Slack. The series was produced by DC Entertainment and Warner Bros. Animation. Sander Schwartz was tagged as the executive producer for the series. This marks the last season of Teen Titans being aired on The WB Television Network, from September 2005 to December 2005, skipping insignificant episodes. It also became the only season that The CW did not re-air during the 2007–08 U.S network television season, as the first two seasons of the series only re-aired on Kids' WB.  

The series focuses on a team of crime-fighting teenaged superheroes, consisting of the leader Robin (voiced by Scott Menville), foreign alien princess Starfire, green shapeshifter Beast Boy, the dark sorceress Raven, and the technological genius Cyborg. The season focuses on Cyborg's difficulty accepting his own maturity, and his desire to lead his own team, which brings him into conflict with the Teen Titans (Robin in particular). The season also focuses on his battles with the supervillain Brother Blood.

The season premiered on August 28, 2004 and ran until January 22, 2005 broadcasting 13 episodes. Warner Bros. Home Video released the third season on DVD in the United States and Canada on April 10, 2007. Despite receiving positive reviews, many critics agreed that the third season was inferior to its predecessor.

Production
Season three of Teen Titans aired on Cartoon Network from August 28, 2004 to January 22, 2005. The season was produced by DC Entertainment and Warner Bros. Animation, executive produced by Sander Schwartz and produced by Glen Murakami, Bruce Timm and Linda M. Steiner. Staff directors for the series included Christopher Berkeley, Michael Chang, Ben Jones and Alex Soto. The episodes for the season were written by a team of writers, which consisted of Adam Beechen, Rick Copp, Richard Elliott, John Esposito, Louis Hirshorn, Rob Hoegee, Greg Klein, Dwayne McDuffie, Thomas Pugsley, Simon Racioppa, Joelle Sellner, David Slack, Marv Wolfman and Amy Wolfram. Producer Murakami worked with Derrick Wyatt, Brianne Drouhard, and Jon Suzuki on character design while Hakjoon Kang served as the background designer for the series. The season employed a number of storyboard artists, including Eric Canete, Colin Heck, Kalvin Lee, Keo Thongkham, Scooter Tidwell, Alan Wan and Matt Youngberg.

Cast and characters

The five voice actors for the main characters - Scott Menville, Hynden Walch, Greg Cipes, Tara Strong, and Khary Payton - reprise their roles in the third season as Robin, Starfire, Beast Boy, Raven, and Cyborg, respectively. In addition to her role as Starfire, Walch reprises the role of Blackfire in the episode "Betrothed." Season three introduces a new main villain, Brother Blood, voiced by John DiMaggio. Dee Bradley Baker returns to the series, providing voices for several characters, including Cinderblock in the episode "Haunted"; Glgrdsklechhh in the episode "Betrothed"; Werebeast, Beast Boy's alter ego, in the episode "The Beast Within"; and the Teen Titan's pet Silkie in the episode "Can I Keep Him?". Lauren Tom recurs in the season, voicing Gizmo in two episodes and Jinx in the season premiere "Deception." T'Keyah Crystal Keymáh and Wil Wheaton also recur in the season as Bumblebee and Aqualad.

Season three of Teen Titans featured numerous guest actors providing voices for recurring and guest characters. In the episode "Deception", Kevin Michael Richardson plays the villain Mammoth. James Hong reprises his role as Professor Chang in the episode "X." Alan Shearman provided the voice of Starfire's legal guardian Galfore in the episode "Betrothed." The episode "Haunted" featured the return of veteran voice actor Ron Perlman in his role as Slade. In the episode "Spellbound", Greg Ellis provides the voice of Malchior, Raven's love interest turned villain. The episode "Revolution" features Malcolm McDowell reprising his role as the villain Mad Mod. David Markus played the villain Adonis in the episode "The Beast Within." In the episode "Can I Keep Him?",  musician Henry Rollins reprised his role as Johnny Rancid while Canadian actor Marc Worden played the villain Killer Moth, replacing Thomas Haden Church from the previous season. The episode "Bunny Raven... or... How to Make A Titananimal Disappear" features veteran actor Tom Kenny voicing the villain Mumbo. The two part season finale "Titans East" featured Mike Erwin reprising the role of Speedy and Freddy Rodriguez playing Más y Menos.

Reception
The season received generally positive reviews from critics, but has been cited as being inferior to its predecessor. IGN writer Filip Vukcevic gave the season a mixed review, highlighting the season's "insistence on not trying anything new - in terms of storytelling" as a setback: "We really need to be reminded why we should care about these characters, and this team, in fresh, funny ways. Once a show like this has reached its third season it's really got to put in the extra hours; the character-train has got to keep moving forward." Vukcevic also found that the new villain Brother Blood "isn't a particularly interesting or menacing villain." Vukcevic, however, noted the visual gags and the episodes "Revolution" and "Bunny Raven or How to Make a Titananimal Disappear" as highlights of the third season. He ultimately gave the season a 6 out of 10 rating. Mac McEntire of DVD Verdict awarded the third season an 86, praising the writers for exploring the main characters in more depth, particularly with Cyborg and Robin, but was dismissive of the comedic elements featured in the season. John Sinnott, writing for DVD Talk, deemed the third season release as "Highly Recommended." Sinnott noted that the season wasn't as strong as the previous two, but still "have a lot of action, a good amount of humor, and even a few touching scenes", highlighting the episodes "Haunted" and "Spellbound." In 2004, Matthew Youngberg was nominated at the 32nd Annie Awards for Best Storyboarding in a Television Production for his work on the episode "Haunted".

Episodes

DVD release
The DVD boxset was released on April 10, 2007 in the United States and Canada. It features a series title Teen Titans: Know Your Foes, featurette which is segmented for each of the series main villains.

References

Teen Titans (TV series) seasons
2004 American television seasons